The 2001 AFC Futsal Championship was held in Tehran, Iran from 14 July to 20 July 2001.

Venue

Draw

Group stage

Group A

Group B

Group C

Third placed teams

Knockout stage

Quarter-finals

Semi-finals

Third place play-off

Final

Awards 

 Top Scorer
 Vahid Shamsaei (31 goals)

References

 Futsal Planet

AFC Futsal Championship
AFC
2001
Championship